The Schwedentritt cross-country skiing trail (Loipe Schwedentritt in German) is a cross-country skiing trail in Einsiedeln in Switzerland. The trail is groomed in both skating and classic style. It begins at Einsiedeln Abbey, then leads along Sihlsee and finally through the Schwantenau high moorland. The total distance is 21.1 km (Half marathon), but can be shortened to 4, 12 or 15 km. Due to the numerous inclines, the trail is physically demanding. Since the landscape with its bogs and birches is reminiscent of Sweden, the trail was named Schwedentritt (literally Sweden's step) in the 1970s.

Einsiedeln ski marathon 
Every February the Einsiedeln ski marathon takes place on the trail. The Einsiedeln-born cross-country skiing legend and Olympic medal winner Alois «Wisel» Kälin took part in the competition several times and also won several times, thus contributing to the popularity of the trail.

Images

References 

Cross-country skiing in Switzerland